Shangzhi Subdistrict  is a subdistrict under the jurisdiction of Daoli District, Harbin City, Heilongjiang Province, People's Republic of China. , it administers the following three residential neighborhoods:
Xishiwudao Street Community
Zhongyang Avenue Community
Xiejiao Street Community

See also
List of township-level divisions of Heilongjiang

References

Township-level divisions of Heilongjiang
Harbin